Tamanchey is an Indian Hindi-language romantic crime comedy film released on 10 October 2014. The film is directed by Navneet Behal and stars Nikhil Dwivedi and Richa Chadda in leads.

Plot
An escaped criminal (Nikhil Dwivedi) becomes smitten with bold, beautiful and foul-mouthed companion (Richa Chadda). The film ends with a smile on their faces

Cast

 Nikhil Dwivedi as Munna 
 Richa Chadda as Bindiya a.k.a. Babu

Production
The film started shooting in early 2014 and shot most parts in New Delhi. Richa Chadda slapped Nikhil Dwiwedi 16 times for a scene.

Promotions
Actor Salman Khan promoted this film stating that Khan liked the film.
Khan also launched the film song "In Da Club"

Soundtrack

References

External links

Films about organised crime in India
Films shot in India
2010s Hindi-language films
Romantic crime films
Films scored by Krsna Solo
Films scored by R. D. Burman
Films scored by Ikka
Films scored by Arko Pravo Mukherjee